Ferruginibacter yonginensis is a Gram-negative, aerobic and rod-shaped bacterium from the genus of Ferruginibacter which has been isolated from a mesotrophic artificial lake.

References

Chitinophagia
Bacteria described in 2014